Abubaker "Bob" Ajisafe (born 13 April 1985) is a British professional boxer. He challenged for the IBO light-heavyweight title in 2016. At regional level, he held the British light-heavyweight title in 2014 and the Commonwealth light-heavyweight title in 2015.

Professional career
Born in Nottingham and now based in Leeds, Ajisafe turned professional in 2007 after a successful amateur career, winning his first six fights. In 2009 he competed in the Prizefighter tournament, losing in the quarter-final to Carl Dilks. Wins over Ovill McKenzie and Phil Goodwin in 2009 set him up for a challenge for Tony Bellew's Commonwealth title in September 2010; Bellew took a unanimous points decision despite being knocked down in the fourth round.

Ajisafe's next fight was against Darren Stubbs in July 2011 for the vacant English light-heavyweight title, Ajisafe winning after a cut above Stubbs' eye forced a stoppage. He successfully defended the title against Travis Dickinson in December 2012.

In March 2014 he met Dean Francis for the vacant British light-heavyweight title, taking a unanimous points decision. He subsequently beat Leon Senior and in November 2014 beat Matty Clarkson to win the MaxiNutrition Knockout Trophy.

In January 2015, Commonwealth champion Enzo Maccarinelli was ordered to make a mandatory defence of his title against Ajisafe.

Professional boxing record

References

External links

1985 births
Living people
Boxers from Nottingham
English male boxers
Light-heavyweight boxers